A total lunar eclipse occurred on Tuesday, November 8, 2022. The southern limb of the Moon passed through the center of the Earth's shadow. It surpassed the previous eclipse as the longest total lunar eclipse visible from nearly all of North America since August 17, 1989, and until June 26, 2029. Occurring only 5.8 days before apogee (on November 14, 2022), the Moon's apparent diameter was smaller. The next total lunar eclipse will take place on March 14, 2025. A lunar occultation of Uranus happened during the eclipse. It was the first total lunar eclipse on Election Day in US history. This event was referred in media coverage as a "beaver blood moon".

This lunar eclipse was the fourth and last of an almost tetrad, the others being 26 May 2021 (T), 19 Nov 2021 (P) and 16 May 2022 (T).

Visibility
The eclipse was completely visible over the Pacific and most of North America. It was seen on the rising moon in Australia, Asia and in the far north-east of Europe, and on the setting moon in South America and eastern North America.

Related eclipses

Eclipses of 2022 
 A partial solar eclipse on 30 April.
 A total lunar eclipse on 16 May.
 A partial solar eclipse on 25 October.
 A total lunar eclipse on 8 November.

Lunar year series

Saros series
This eclipse was a part of Saros cycle 136, and the first of the series that passes through the center of the Earth's shadow. The last occurrence was on 28 October 2004. The next occurrence will happen on 18 November 2040.

Half-Saros cycle
A lunar eclipse will be preceded and followed by solar eclipses by 9 years and 5.5 days (a half saros). This lunar eclipse was related to two hybrid solar eclipses of Solar Saros 143.

Metonic series
This eclipse is the third of five Metonic cycle lunar eclipses on the same date, 8–9 November:

Tritos series 
 Preceded: Lunar eclipse of December 10, 2011

 Followed: Lunar eclipse of October 8, 2033

Tzolkinex 
 Preceded: Lunar eclipse of September 28, 2015

 Followed: Lunar eclipse of December 20, 2029

Observations

See also
Lists of lunar eclipses and List of lunar eclipses in the 21st century
November 2021 lunar eclipse

References

External links
Saros cycle 136

2022-11
2022-11
2022 in science
November 2022 events